Tim Martin Gleason is an American actor known for his roles in the musical The Phantom of the Opera. He has also appeared in films and television episodes.

Early life and education
Gleason was born in Piscataway, New Jersey. He earned a Bachelor of Arts degree in psychology from Saint Joseph's University in Pennsylvania. Gleason performed in theatre productions in high school and college.

Career
Until November 2010, Gleason starred as The Phantom in Andrew Lloyd Webber's The Phantom of the Opera. He completed a record-setting tenure as Raoul with three different American companies of The Phantom of the Opera. Initially a member of the ensemble of the touring company in 2001, Gleason quickly took over the role of Raoul, playing the role for over three years. He was then asked to join the Broadway production to be Raoul for the record-breaking company when Phantom became the longest-running show in Broadway history.

Gleason was then chosen by the creative team to originate the role of Raoul for Phantom: The Las Vegas Spectacular at the Venetian Hotel in Las Vegas. He rejoined the Broadway cast in September 2007 and played Raoul for an additional year and a half. With his time in all three companies, Gleason is the longest-running Raoul in American history, having played the role more than 2,600 times.

Prior to his success with Phantom, he appeared as Romeo in Terrence Mann's Romeo & Juliet: The Rock Opera at The Goodspeed Opera House and Adam Gernstein in The Rhythm Club at the Signature Theatre, a role for which he received a Helen Hayes Award nomination.

He has performed in theaters all across the country portraying many roles, including Tony in West Side Story, Tommy in The Who's Tommy, Joseph in Joseph and the Amazing Technicolor Dreamcoat, Cinderella’s Prince/Wolf and Rapunzel's Prince in Into the Woods, and Henrik in A Little Night Music.

In 2015, he appeared as Tom Burke in the Amazon series The Kicks. Gleason is a member of Actors' Equity Association (AEA).

Filmography

Film

Television

References

External links

Tim Martin Gleason website, archived

Year of birth missing (living people)
Living people
American male musical theatre actors
Saint Joseph's University alumni